Clark Todd Scully (September 13, 1948 – September 6, 2021) was an American racewalker. He competed in the men's 20 kilometres walk at the 1976 Summer Olympics.

He competed on the track and field team at Lynchburg College in the 1960s, and graduated with a chemistry degree in 1970. He later returned to Lynchburg College for a graduate degree in physical education and secondary education in 1975. He is a member of the University of Lynchburg Sports Hall of Fame.

He was selected for the Olympic team in 1980, but the U.S. boycotted the games. A 2014 alumni magazine of Virginia Tech, where he was a graduate student in 1980, described his disappointment: "You just spent four years making progress and improvement, and you end up not being able to use it. Between '76 and '80, I think I set seven world records. ... I was ready to compete."

References

External links
 

1948 births
2021 deaths
Athletes (track and field) at the 1976 Summer Olympics
American male racewalkers
Olympic track and field athletes of the United States
People from Princeton, New Jersey
Sportspeople from Mercer County, New Jersey
Track and field athletes from New Jersey
Pan American Games medalists in athletics (track and field)
Pan American Games bronze medalists for the United States
Athletes (track and field) at the 1975 Pan American Games
Athletes (track and field) at the 1979 Pan American Games
Medalists at the 1979 Pan American Games